Ooni Lúwo Gbàgìdá (sometimes spelled as Luwo) was the 21st Ooni of Ife, a paramount traditional ruler of Ile Ife, the ancestral home of the Yorubas in the 10th century. She was the daughter or a descendant of  Ooni Otaataa from Owode compound, Okerewe, and a descendant of Ooni Lafogido. Luwoo was married to one of the high chief known as Obaloran and gave birth to a son named Adekola Telu, She was the first and the only female paramount  ruler of Ile-ife known to be the origin of Yoruba tribe in soth-westhern, Nigeria and was succeeded Ooni Giesi and was succeeded by  
Ooni Lumobi. Ooni Luwoo's reign remains the only one by a female in Ife till date. Her son Adekola Telu was the founder of the Iwo Kingdom.

References

Oonis of Ife
Yoruba history
Yoruba queens regnant
History of women in Nigeria